Cyanea angustifolia is a plant in the genus Cyanea that is found in Hawaii. Leaves of this species, as well as the endangered ʻakuʻaku (Cyanea platyphylla), were wrapped in ti (kī) leaves, cooked in an ʻimu and eaten in times of food scarcity by early Hawaiians.

References

angustifolia
Plants described in 1833
Endemic flora of Hawaii